(September 19, 1948 – November 3, 2009) was a Japanese baseball player and manager of the Hiroshima Toyo Carp.

Early life
Mimura was born in Kaita, Hiroshima.

References 

1948 births
2009 deaths
Baseball people from Hiroshima Prefecture
Japanese baseball players
Hiroshima Carp players
Hiroshima Toyo Carp players
Managers of baseball teams in Japan
Hiroshima Toyo Carp managers